Arne Van Gelder (born November 13, 1997) was a Belgian male professional acrobatic gymnast. Arne started competing for the Belgian Federation in 2010 and retired in 2017 after a shoulder injurie.

Together with his partner, Vincent Casse, he became European Champion at the 2015 Acrobatic Gymnastics European Championships and Vice World Champion at the 2016 Acrobatic Gymnastics World Championships.

Career 
Arne was in the top (~flyer) position of a men's group (Men's 4) between 2009 and 2013 after which he took the top position in a Men's duo. In 2010, he joined the National team.

He competed in three consecutive World Championships between 2012 and 2016.

Between 2015 and 2016, he was placed 1st in the FIG's World Ranking in Men's pair discipline (https://nl.wikipedia.org/wiki/F%C3%A9d%C3%A9ration_Internationale_de_Gymnastique) .

Career records

References

1997 births
Living people
Belgian acrobatic gymnasts
Male acrobatic gymnasts
People from Herent
Sportspeople from Flemish Brabant